Mamia III Gurieli, also known as Mamia the Great Gurieli (დიდი გურიელი, Didi Gurieli) or the Black Gurieli (შავი გურიელი, Shavi Gurieli) (died 5 January 1714), of the western Georgian House of Gurieli, was Prince of Guria from 1689 to 1714. Involved in civil wars plaguing western Georgia, he became King of Imereti three times in the years of 1701, 1711–1712, and 1713–1714. After his first reign as king for a year in 1701, he abdicated the throne of Imereti, being unable to tolerate the influence of his father-in-law Giorgi Abashidze. Subsequent periods of his royal career was the result of a feud with Giorgi VII of Imereti. Mamia died while still sitting on the throne of Imereti, which then reverted to his rival Giorgi VII.

Accession and early rule in Guria 
Mamia was a younger son of Giorgi III Gurieli and Tamar Chijavadze. On Giorgi's death at the battle of Rokiti against King Alexander IV of Imereti in 1684, Mamia joined his brothers in exile in Akhaltsikhe under the protection of its Ottoman governor Yusuf-Pasha. In the subsequent infighting between Mamia's elder brother Kaikhosro and his paternal uncle Malakia, the former lost his life, while the latter was deprived of his sight. Eventually, in 1689, at the request of Guria's nobility, Mamia was summoned from Akhaltsikhe and installed as prince-regnant with the pasha's support, while the blinded Malakia was made Bishop of Shemokmedi by the new Gurieli ruler.   

In 1690, Mamia hosted Giorgi XI, the exiled king of Kartli and a foe of Alexander IV of Imereti, but soon became suspicious of his nobles' loyalty to the guest and began a crackdown on the suspected opposition, forcing Giorgi to relocate to the Ottoman-controlled Gonio. In the incessant power struggles in Imereti, Mamia originally supported his father-in-law Giorgi Abashidze, but, in 1699, he helped Abashidze's estranged son-in-law, King Simon, return from his exile in Kartli and recover the crown of Imereti. In return, Simon agreed to divorce Abashidze's daughter Anika and marry Mamia's sister. Abashidze, supported by the Mingrelian regent Giorgi Lipartiani, marshaled his troops on the borders of Guria and requested that Gurieli kill Simon, promising to make Mamia king of Imereti. Gurieli refused to do that himself, but allowed Abashidze's agents to shoot Simon dead in a bathroom in 1701.

First reign in Imereti and Ottoman invasion 
Pursuant to his promise, Abashidze made Mamia king of Imereti, if in name only. Abashidze controlled royal domains, revenues, and nobility, while Mamia had to sell his Gurian subjects in slavery to meet his own expenses. Later that year, Mamia felt compelled to abdicate and retire to Guria. Abashidze made himself king of Imereti and, thus, a suzerain of Guria and Mingrelia. 

In 1703, Guria as well as the rest of western Georgia faced a major invasion by the Ottoman Empire. Eager to tighten a loosening grip over their Caucasian subjects, the Ottomans mounted a large-scale invasion, with the intention to eliminate the sovereignty of Guria and limit that of Imereti. A revolt of the troops bound to Georgia forced the Ottomans to withdraw from Georgia's interior, but the coastal area around Batumi was permanently lost for Guria.

Second and third reigns in Imereti 
By 1707, the unity imposed by Abashidze on western Georgia crumbled. In 1709, Abashidze and his Mingrelian allies were defeated by his rival Giorgi VII, who enjoyed the Ottomans' support. Giorgi then raided and ravaged Guria in response of Mamia's support of Abashidze. Giorgi's corrupt rule soon became intolerable to the Imeretians; in October 1711, Mamia secured the support of the nobles of Mingrelia, Racha, and Lechkhumi and reestablished himself as king of Imereti, leaving Guria to his son Giorgi IV Gurieli. During his tenure, he banned slave-trading and opened schools in Guria. 

Both Giorgi VII and Giorgi Abashidze took refuge with King Vakhtang VI of Kartli, who attempted to end the feud. Abashidze returned to his estates in Imereti. The deposed king Giorgi went to Akhaltsikhe and conspired with Zurab Abashidze, Giorgi Abashidze's nephew, who had been dispossessed by Mamia. In June 1712, Giorgi VII and Zurab Abashidze secretly invaded the district of Argveti and inflicted defeat on Mamia and Giorgi Abashidze at Chkhari.  

Gurieli fled to Racha and then to Kartli, where he was hosted in Tskhinvali by Vakhtang VI's son Bakar. Supported by the government of Kartli, Mamia made his way to Guria. In November 1713, Mamia Gurieli, joined by Dadiani, the duke of Racha, Giorgi Abashidze, and the Lechkhumians, defeated King Giorgi at Kutaisi and forced him into flight to Akhaltsikhe. Mamia died two months later, on 5 January 1714 and Giorgi VII was restored once again. Mamia's remains were taken to Guria and interred at the Shemokmedi Monastery.

Family 
Mamia Gurieli was married twice. He first wed, in 1698, Elene, daughter of Giorgi Abashidze. Their marriage was repudiated in 1711 and Mamia married Tamar (died 1716), daughter of Papuna I, Duke of Racha, and former wife of Prince Papuna Chkheidze. After the death of Mamia, she married his husband's rival King Giorgi VII of Imereti, but died shortly after the marriage and was buried at Gelati.

Mamia had seven children, four sons and three daughters:

 Prince Giorgi IV Gurieli (1702–1726), Regent in Guria (1711–1714), Prince of Guria (1714–1726), King of Imereti (1716);
 Prince Kaikhosro III Gurieli (died c. 1751), rival Prince of Guria (1716);
 Prince Nikoloz (died 1755), Bishop of Semokmedi c. 1719;
 Prince Levan, rival regent in Guria (1711–1713);
 Princess Tamar (died 1742), who was married to Giorgi IV Dadiani from 1710 to 1714 and Giorgi VII of Imereti from 1716 to 1720; 
 Princess N., wife of Aslan-Pasha of Akhaltsikhe; 
 Princess N., wife of Giorgi Shervashidze, Duke in Guria.

References 

1714 deaths
House of Gurieli
Kings of Imereti
Year of birth unknown
Eastern Orthodox monarchs
17th-century people from Georgia (country)
18th-century people from Georgia (country)